The Polish surname of Stryjkowski was borne by at least two notable personalities:

 Maciej Stryjkowski (alias Strykowski; ca. 1547 - ca. 1593), a poet and historian
 Julian Stryjkowski (born Pesach Stark, 1905-1996), a writer